Lehigh Valley Hospital, also known as Lehigh Valley Hospital-Cedar Crest, is a hospital in Allentown, Pennsylvania. 

Lehigh Valley Hospital is the largest hospital in the Lehigh Valley metropolitan region and the third largest hospital in Pennsylvania with 877 licensed beds and the third most operating rooms (46) of any Pennsylvania hospital. Lehigh Valley Reilly Children's Hospital is also located on the hospital's Cedar Crest campus in Allentown.

Lehigh Valley Hospital is the flagship hospital of Lehigh Valley Health Network (LVHN), a multi-campus healthcare network in eastern Pennsylvania that also includes seven smaller full-service hospitals in the region:

Lehigh Valley Hospital-17th Street in Allentown
Lehigh Valley Hospital-Muhlenberg in Bethlehem 
Lehigh Valley Hospital-Hecktown Oaks in Easton
Lehigh Valley Hospital-Hazleton in Hazleton
Lehigh Valley Hospital-Schuylkill East in Pottsville
Lehigh Valley Hospital-Schuylkill South in Pottsville
Lehigh Valley Hospital-Pocono in East Stroudsburg  

LVHN also has community health centers, primary care and specialty physician practices, pharmacies, imaging, home health, hospice, laboratory services and other health services in eight Pennsylvania counties: Berks, Bucks, Carbon, Lehigh, Luzerne, Monroe, Northampton, and Schuylkill.

Hospital rankings
In the 2021 edition of U.S. News & World Report Best Hospitals Rankings, Lehigh Valley Hospital-Cedar Crest is ranked as the fifth best hospital overall in Pennsylvania and is ranked as "high performing" in gastroenterology and GI surgery, geriatrics, neurology and neurosurgery, orthopedics, pulmonology and lung surgery, and urology.     

LVHN hospitals are the only Lehigh Valley hospitals participating in the Leapfrog Group's evaluation of health care safety, quality and customer value.  Lehigh Valley Hospital is one of 39 hospitals nationwide to receive the 2007 Leapfrog Group Top Hospital award. All LVHN hospitals meet Leapfrog standards for patient safety. and each are accredited by the Joint Commission.

On February 23, 2011, Becker's Hospital Review listed Lehigh Valley Hospital-Cedar Crest in its "50 Best Hospitals in America" report. It is also a three time certified National Magnet Hospital for nursing excellence from the American Nurses Credentialing Center.

The Joint Commission designated Lehigh Valley-Cedar Crest campus as a comprehensive stroke center in 2014.

Notable people

Hospitalizations
Ryan Hunter-Reay, American professional race car driver (August 20, 2017–August 21, 2017)
Robert Wickens, Canadian professional race car driver (August 19, 2018–August 31, 2018)

Deaths
Maurice Broun, American ornithologist and author (October 2, 1979)
Mulgrew Miller, jazz musician (May 29, 2013)
Thomas Welsh, American Catholic bishop (February 19, 2009)
Justin Wilson, British professional race car driver (August 24, 2015)

Notes

External links

Lehigh Valley Hospital-Cedar Crest official website
Lehigh Valley Health Network official website

Buildings and structures in Allentown, Pennsylvania
Hospitals established in 1899
Hospitals in the Lehigh Valley
[[Category:Trauma Centers